Coburg is a city in Montgomery County, Iowa, United States. The population was 26 at the 2020 census.

History
Coburg got its start following construction of the railroad through the territory.

Geography
Coburg is located at  (40.916701, -95.265950).

Demographics

2010 census
As of the census of 2010, there were 42 people, 13 households, and 12 families residing in the city. The racial makeup of the city was 95.2% White and 4.8% from two or more races.

There were 13 households, of which 38.5% had children under the age of 18 living with them, 53.8% were married couples living together, 15.4% had a female householder with no husband present, 23.1% had a male householder with no wife present, and 7.7% were non-families. 0.0% of all households were made up of individuals. The average household size was 3.23 and the average family size was 2.92.

The median age in the city was 30 years. 31% of residents were under the age of 18; 16.5% were between the ages of 18 and 24; 19.1% were from 25 to 44; 26.2% were from 45 to 64; and 7.1% were 65 years of age or older. The gender makeup of the city was 54.8% male and 45.2% female.

2000 census
As of the census of 2000, there were 31 people, 12 households, and 9 families residing in the city. The racial makeup of the city was 100.00% White.

There were 12 households, out of which 50.0% had children under the age of 18 living with them, 66.7% were married couples living together, and 16.7% were non-families. 16.7% of all households were made up of individuals, and none had someone living alone who was 65 years of age or older. The average household size was 2.58 and the average family size was 2.90.

In the city, the population was spread out, with 35.5% under the age of 18, 29.0% from 25 to 44, 35.5% from 45 to 64, . The median age was 32 years. For every 100 females, there were 72.2 males. For every 100 females age 18 and over, there were 122.2 males.

The median income for a household in the city was $33,750, and the median income for a family was $31,875. Males had a median income of $28,750 versus $19,375 for females. The per capita income for the city was $10,329. There were 11.1% of families and 21.2% of the population living below the poverty line, including 35.3% of under eighteens and none of those over 64.

Education
The Red Oak Community School District operates local area public schools.

References

Cities in Iowa
Cities in Montgomery County, Iowa